Georgiana Emma Drew (July 11, 1856 – July 2, 1893),  Georgie Drew Barrymore, was an American stage actress and comedian and a member of the Barrymore acting family.

Life and career
Georgiana Drew was born in Philadelphia. Her family — parents John Drew and Louisa Lane Drew, brothers John Drew, Jr. and Sidney, and sister Louisa (d. 1888) were all actors. She made her theatrical debut in 1872 in The Ladies' Rattle. She followed John Jr. to New York City, where she acted in many Broadway hits, such as Pique and As You Like It. In Pique she met a young English actor, 26 year old, Maurice Barrymore, whom she married on December 31, 1876. They had three children: Lionel, Ethel, and John. She is a great-grandmother and partial namesake of actress Drew Barrymore.

According to a 2004 A&E Biography piece, the marriage, happy at first, became rocky as Maurice indulged in numerous affairs. Georgie even filed for divorce, but they reconciled. He asked her to tour with him and Helena Modjeska in a play he wrote. Learning that he and Helena had resumed their romance, Georgie, who had been given ownership of the play by Maurice, closed it. Helena's husband, its producer, sued her. The real reason for Georgie's actions never got into the press.

In 1890, she had a great success in The Senator co-starring William H. Crane and, in 1891, as one of the two widows in Mr. Wilkinson's Widows. Her stage career at this time was being managed by a young up-and-coming producer named Charles Frohman. Frohman would play a big part in managing the early careers of her three children, as well as her brother John Drew. 

In December 1891, illness forced her to leave the stage.  In 1893 she traveled west with Ethel to take a supposed cure for tuberculosis. It proved to be unsuccessful; she died a few weeks later in Santa Barbara, California. Reportedly, her last words, which she kept repeating, were, "Oh my poor kids! What shall ever become of them?", as told by Ethel years later while the two were on the steamer heading to Panama, and as related to her son John, in the 1920s, by an elderly woman who had been staying at the same boarding house in Santa Barbara as Georgie and Ethel. It was 13-year-old Ethel's responsibility to see that her mother's remains were returned to Philadelphia for burial by Mrs Drew and Maurice, who met Ethel's train in Chicago. In 1893, this coast-to-coast journey would have lasted a week.

Barrymore died on July 2, 1893, nine days before her 37th birthday. She was originally interred at Glenwood Cemetery, but reinterred at Mount Vernon Cemetery in Philadelphia.

References

Sources
 Encyclopædia Britannica

External links

 
 

1856 births
1893 deaths
Georgiana Drew
19th-century American actresses
American stage actresses
19th-century deaths from tuberculosis
Actresses from Philadelphia
Burials at Glenwood Cemetery/Glenwood Memorial Gardens
Burials at Mount Vernon Cemetery (Philadelphia)
Tuberculosis deaths in California